Mouat v Clark Boyce [1992] 2 NZLR 559 is a cited case in New Zealand regarding  the award of damages for breach of contract.

Background
Dorothy Mouat was an elderly 72-year-old widow. Her son Robert Mouat wanted to borrow $100,000 for house alterations and for business expenses, and arranged for his mother to grant a mortgage over her Roydvale Avenue, Christchurch home as security for the loan.

When it came to sign the mortgage documents, Robert's solicitor refused to be party to the transaction, and Robert decided to use the law firm of Clark Boyce, whom were also his mother's solicitors.

Clarke Boyce informed Mrs Mouat 3 times that she should obtain independent advice, which she declined to do. In the end they got her to sign a form confirming that she refused to seek legal advice, and the mortgage documents were duly signed.

However, 2 years later, perhaps unsurprisingly, with Robert defaulting on the loan, and was later declared bankrupt as well.

Dorothy later sued Clarke Boyce for negligence. 

The outcome of the case pertained that because Clark Boyce had made Mouat aware of the fiduciary obligations, Clark Boyce was not liable for any losses.

References

Court of Appeal of New Zealand cases
New Zealand contract case law
1992 in New Zealand law
1992 in case law